In mathematics, a Gassmann triple (or Gassmann-Sunada triple) is a group G together with two faithful actions on sets X and Y, such that X and Y are not isomorphic as G-sets but every element of G has the same number of fixed points on X and Y. They were introduced by Fritz Gassmann in 1926.

Applications
Gassmann triples have been  used to construct examples of pairs of mathematical objects with the same invariants that are not isomorphic, including arithmetically equivalent number fields and isospectral graphs and isospectral Riemannian manifolds.

Examples

The simple group G  =   SL3(F2) of order 168 acts on the projective plane of order 2, and the actions on the 7 points and 7 lines give a Gassmann triple.

References

 

Permutation groups